John Cunningham (28 December 1867 – 30 October 1949) was an Australian farmer and politician who was a Country Party member of the Legislative Assembly of Western Australia from 1914 to 1917, representing the seat of Greenough.

Cunningham was born in Northampton, Western Australia, to Mary (née Lenahan) and Timothy Cunningham. He farmed in the area and was prominent in local agricultural circles, also serving on the Northampton Road Board.  Cunningham entered parliament at the 1914 state election, replacing the retiring John Nanson. He was defeated at the 1917 election by Henry Maley, another endorsed Country candidate, and failed to even make the final two-candidate-preferred count. After leaving politics, Cunningham returned to farming. He died in Geraldton in October 1949, aged 81, and was unmarried.

References

1867 births
1949 deaths
Australian farmers
Members of the Western Australian Legislative Assembly
National Party of Australia members of the Parliament of Western Australia
People from Northampton, Western Australia
Western Australian local councillors